Lonchoderma is a genus of molluscs belonging to the family Prochaetodermatidae.

Species:
 Lonchoderma longisquamosum (Salvini-Plawen, 1986)

References

Molluscs